Jacob D. Steiner was a member of the South Dakota House of Representatives.

Biography
Steiner was born in Lomira, Wisconsin in June 1861. In 1890, he married Amanda Korte. They would have five children.

Career
Steiner was a member of the House of Representatives from 1903 to 1906. He was a Republican.

References

People from Lomira, Wisconsin
Republican Party members of the South Dakota House of Representatives
1861 births
Year of death missing